The Happy Ending is a 1925 British silent drama film directed by George A. Cooper and starring Fay Compton, Jack Buchanan and Joan Barry. It was based on a play by Ian Hay. Its plot concerns a father who deserted his family some years before returning home only to find his wife has told his children and neighbours that he died as a hero when he abandoned them. A sound film of the same play The Happy Ending (also featuring Benita Hume) was made in 1931.

Cast
 Fay Compton as Mildred Craddock 
 Jack Buchanan as Captain Dale Conway 
 Joan Barry as Molly Craddock 
 Jack Hobbs as Denis Craddock 
 Gladys Jennings as Joan Craddock 
 Eric Lewis as Sir Anthony Fenwick 
 Donald Searle as Harold Bagby 
 Drusilla Wills as Laura Meakin 
  Pat Doyle as The Maid 
 A.G. Poulton as Mr. Moon 
 Benita Hume as Miss Moon 
 Doris Mansell as Phyllis Harding

References

External links
 

1925 films
Films directed by George A. Cooper
1925 drama films
British films based on plays
Films based on works by Ian Hay
British drama films
British silent feature films
British black-and-white films
1920s English-language films
1920s British films
Silent drama films